Diarhabdosia is a genus of moths in the subfamily Arctiinae. The genus was erected by George Hampson in 1900.

Species
 Diarhabdosia brunnea
 Diarhabdosia minima
 Diarhabdosia strigipennis

References

External links

Lithosiini
Moth genera